The Californication Tour was a worldwide concert tour by Red Hot Chili Peppers to support their seventh studio album Californication which saw the return of guitarist John Frusciante who rejoined the band in 1998 after quitting six years earlier.

A DVD documenting the tour titled Off the Map, which was made up of footage from different shows, was released in 2001.

Overview

1998 tour
Following the firing of Dave Navarro in early 1998, Flea felt the only way the band could continue was if John Frusciante returned to the band. Frusciante quit the band in 1992 during the height of their success on their Blood Sugar Sex Magik Tour and spiraled into a heavy drug addiction which almost took his life. Flea always remained in contact, and he helped talk Frusciante into admitting himself to Las Encinas Drug Rehabilitation Center in January 1998. He concluded the process in February of that year and began renting a small apartment in Silver Lake, California. Singer Anthony Kiedis was surprised and thought there was no way Frusciante would ever want to work with him as the two still had unresolved personal problems from when Frusciante quit in 1992. With Frusciante free of his addictions and ailments, Kiedis and Flea thought it was an appropriate time to invite him back. In April 1998, when Flea visited him at his home and asked him to rejoin the band, Frusciante began sobbing and said "nothing would make me happier in the world." Flea decided to contact Kiedis and have him meet with Frusciante to try and resolve any personal problems that the two might have had. Flea was relieved to find out that both had no bad blood towards each other and were once again excited to make music together. Within the week and, for the first time in six years, the reunited foursome jump-started the newly reunited Red Hot Chili Peppers. With the band ready to make their comeback, a short 12 date tour was scheduled from June until September. On June 5, 1998, and for the first time since 1992 with Frusciante, gave an acoustic performance at KBLT Radio Studios in Los Angeles which was hosted by Mike Watt and featured Keith Morris as the DJ. The highlights included the very first performance of "Soul to Squeeze", solo songs by Flea and Frusciante and Morris joining the band on vocals (he originally filled in for Kiedis for one show in 1986) for a cover of Black Flag's "Nervous Breakdown". Seven days later the band gave their first official public performance at the 9:30 Club in Washington, D.C. The band was also in town to perform at the Tibetan Freedom Concert however their set was cancelled due to a severe thunderstorm that left one girl severely burned by a lightning strike (Kiedis would visit her in the hospital). Pearl Jam decided to cut their set short so the Chili Peppers could perform a quick three song set. Shows in New York City. Chicago (a special private show for Miller Genuine Draft contest winners), California and Las Vegas followed with a nine date tour of Central America being cancelled so the band could focus on recording their next album Californication.

This brief 1998 tour marked the official live debuts of songs that would eventually be featured the following year on Californication such as "Emit Remmus", "I Like Dirt", "Parallel Universe" and "Scar Tissue". "Bunker Hill", a song originally intended for the album but not released until 2003's Greatest Hits, was also performed for the first time during this tour and has never been performed since then.

Californication tour
The Californication Tour was the band's biggest to date and most successful helping breaking them through to an even wider audience and seeing their supporting album achieve their largest worldwide sales. The anticipation for the tour was very high due to the recent return of Frusciante the previous year. The tour started in May 1999, Red Hot with a promotional tour also known as the "Stop the Hate" Tour. These concerts were only for high school students that wrote an essay on how to stop violence in schools. The world tour featured a large mixture of music from the band's entire catalog, although the band's previous album, 1995's One Hot Minute was only represented with Flea's song, "Pea" and nothing from that album other than that song has been performed with Frusciante. Frusciante, at the time, claimed to have never heard the album. The tour featured a heavy dose of the Californication album and twelve years later, all of the album's songs except for "Porcelain" have been performed live. The tour saw the band headline Woodstock '99 although a lot of controversy came following their set due to the band's performance of the Jimi Hendrix classic, "Fire" (a request made by Hendrix's sister) which some in the media said helped instigate riots in the crowd and bonfires being lit although the band at the time had no knowledge of the chaos about to breakout and claimed if they did, the song would not have been performed.

This tour marked the last time "Backwoods", "Green Heaven", "Organic Anti-Beat Box Band" and "Subterranean Homesick Blues" have been performed live.

Songs performed

Tour dates

Festivals and other miscellaneous performances

Cancellations and rescheduled shows

Box office score data

Opening acts
Stereophonics (Europe, select dates)
Muse (Europe/North America, select dates)
Feeder (London—November 6)
311 (North America, select dates)
The Bicycle Thief (North America, select dates)
Foo Fighters (North America, select dates)
Kool Keith (North America, select dates)
Blonde Redhead (North America, select dates)
Stone Temple Pilots (North America, select dates)
Fishbone (North America, select dates)
Primus (Sacramento)
Puya  (South America)

Personnel
Anthony Kiedis – lead vocals
Flea – bass, backing vocals
John Frusciante – guitar, backing vocals
Chad Smith – drums

External links
Red Hot Chili Peppers website

References

1999 concert tours
2000 concert tours
Red Hot Chili Peppers concert tours